Alban Gerhardt (born 25 May 1969, Berlin) is a German cellist.

From a musical family, Gerhardt is the son of a mother who sang coloratura soprano, and his father, Axel Gerhardt, was a second violinist of the Berlin Philharmonic Orchestra for over 40 years.  His brother Darius is a guitarist.  Gerhardt took up both the piano and the cello at age eight, and studied with Marion Vetter and Götz Teutsch of the Berlin Philharmonic, and eventually began working under Markus Nyikos.  Gerhardt has also been a pupil of Boris Pergamenschikov.

Gerhardt's first public performance came on 22 February 1987, when he played Haydn's Cello Concerto No.2 in D with a chamber orchestra in the Berliner Philharmonie.  His international career was launched in 1991 when he made his debut with the Berlin Philharmonic and Semyon Bychkov.  He won top prizes in several competitions in the early 1990s, including the 1990 Deutsche Musikwettbewerb Bonn, the ARD Competition that same year, and the Leonard Rose Competition in 1993.  Gerhardt was a member of the BBC New Generation Artists scheme from 1999 to 2001.

At the 2009 BBC Proms, he performed the world premiere of Unsuk Chin's Cello Concerto, which Chin composed for Gerhardt.  He subsequently recorded the concerto commercially for Deutsche Grammophon.  Gerhardt has also collaborated with other composers such as Thomas Larcher, Brett Dean, Jörg Widmann, Osvaldo Golijov, Mathias Hinke and Matthias Pintscher.

Gerhardt has won three ECHO Klassik Awards (1998, 2003 & 2009) as well as ICMA and MIDEM Classic awards.  His DG recording of Unsuk Chin's Cello Concerto won the BBC Music Magazine Award in 2015 and was shortlisted for a Gramophone Award in 2015.  He has made several commercial records for Hyperion.  He has also recorded for Chandos Records.

Gerhardt plays a Matteo Goffriller cello, made in 1710.  In addition to his concert performances, Gerhardt has done various projects that have involved performance outside of traditional concert halls, such as in schools, hospitals and young offender institutions.  In 2012, he also began collaboration with Deutsche Bahn, involving live performances on the main commuter routes in Germany.

Gerhardt has been married twice.  His marriage to his first wife, Katalina, produced a son.  His second wife is the violinist Gergana Gergova, and the couple have a son.

References

External links
 Official website of Alban Gerhardt
 Hyperion Records page on Alban Gerhardt
 Tim Janof, 'Conversation with Alban Gerhardt', Internet Cello Society, 26 April 2003
 'Facing the music: Alban Gerhardt'.  The Guardian, 6 April 2015

1969 births
German classical cellists
Living people
BBC Radio 3 New Generation Artists
Oehms Classics artists